"Damn I Wish I Was Your Lover" is a song written and performed by American singer-songwriter Sophie B. Hawkins. Released in March 1992 as the first single from her debut album, Tongues and Tails (1992), the song achieved success in many countries worldwide; in the United States, it reached number five on the Billboard Hot 100. It also reached the top 10 in Australia, Canada, New Zealand, and Norway. In the United Kingdom, the single peaked at number 14 on the UK Singles Chart, becoming Hawkins' second-most successful song on that chart after "Right Beside You", which reached number 13 in 1994. There were made two different versions of the music video for the song, after the first version was banned from MTV for its erotic content.

Background and composition
The song's lyrics are written from the perspective of a woman who is observing another woman in an abusive relationship. Hawkins has explicitly stated that she is what she terms "omnisexual", which means that a lover's gender does not matter to her. The song encourages people to be open-minded about this as well, with the line "Free your mind and you won't feel ashamed", which is meant to combat homophobia and queerphobia. The homoerotic nature of the song was rare at the time, as not many songs dealt with the erotic or romantic love between two women, but it was not picked up on by a large group of listeners, and it is still glossed over in many articles discussing lesbian representation in love songs.

Hawkins performed the songs "Damn I Wish I Was Your Lover" and "As I Lay Me Down" in the season 4 episode 9 "Herstory of Dance" of the television show Community. In the episode, Britta organizes a "Sophie B. Hawkins" dance in protest to Greendale's "Sadie Hawkins" dance.

Critical reception
Roch Parisien from AllMusic described the song as "hook-filled mainstream pop". Upon the release, Larry Flick from Billboard wrote, "Hawkins proves to be a star-in-the-making, delivering a charming vocal over a hypnotic, rock/hip-hop beat. Contagious, sing-along chorus renders tune an unlikely anthem, but one that deserves every bit of airplay it gets." Clark and DeVaney from Cash Box felt that the singer-songwriter "has a sexy, breathy and slightly vulnerable sound". Stephanie Zacharek from Entertainment Weekly remarked that in the "killer single" "Damn I Wish I Was Your Lover", "Hawkins says those words as insouciantly as if she’d just broken a nail. But she still lets you know they mean a hell of a lot more to her than that." Dave Sholin from the Gavin Report stated, "When 1992 is done and gone, we'll likely remember the debut of this singer/songwriter from New York City's Upper West Side as one of the year's musical highlights." He added, "It's not often when programmer consensus is this strong on a new song by an unknown artist, but in this case, it's totally justified. It's one of those that is instantly obvious seconds after it starts."

Pan-European magazine Music & Media said, "Listen to the extremely strong chorus to this pop song, and you'll understand why." Alan Jones from Music Week named it Pick of the Week, writing, "Brooklyn babe's self-penned multi-textured and multi-format debut is a compelling confection. Soulfully shuffling and coyly chiming, it's armed with a killer hook, and knows it. A curious early fade threatens, before Sophie builds it up again." A reviewer from People Magazine noted, "When a record opens with a song called "Damn I Wish I Was Your Lover", you realize immediately you're not dealing with some delicate flower. Hawkins knows what she wants, and she knows how to get it." In an retrospective review, Pop Rescue stated that "this is a wonderfully breathy song which builds well in the chorus and adds more instruments into the second verse." Jonathan Bernstein from Spin wrote, "Not only was her lubricious lament, "Damn I Wish I Was Your Lover", the year's stand-alone Great White Pop Single, but it neatly supplanted "I'm Too Sexy" as the phrase on the nation's lips."

Music video
The original music video for the song featured Hawkins lying on her back in a flowing, light-fabric outfit while singing the song, interspersed with scenes of dancers and of Hawkins kneeling down while wearing a combination of a tube top and essentially a diaper. At the time, television network MTV banned the original version for its erotic content; moreover, Sony Music Entertainment (SME) was still repeatedly banning it from YouTube "on copyright grounds" as of late June 2017. A new video was shot, after the MTV ban, that showed Hawkins in a more conservative outfit of jeans and a flannel shirt, performing the song on a stage together with a band. While the new video was shot entirely in black and white, a significant portion of the original video was in colour (though there were scenes in black and white as well, with some artificial colouring used to artistically enhance the material). A portion of this original video is featured in the documentary The Cream Will Rise. Both video versions used the shorter radio version.

Impact and legacy
Slant Magazine listed "Damn I Wish I Was Your Lover" at number 100 in their ranking of "The 100 Best Singles of the 1990s" in 2011, writing, 

Time Out placed it at number 45 in their list of "The 50 Best Gay Songs to Celebrate Pride All Year Long" in 2022.

Track listings

 US CD and cassette single
 "Damn I Wish I Was Your Lover" – 5:21
 "Don't Stop Swaying" – 5:32

 UK and European 7-inch single
A. "Damn I Wish I Was Your Lover" (radio edit) – 4:08
B. "Don't Stop Swaying" – 5:32

 UK CD single
 "Damn I Wish I Was Your Lover" (radio version) – 4:08
 "Damn I Wish I Was Your Lover" (long version) – 5:22
 "Listen" – 3:31
 "Don't Stop Swaying" – 5:32

 UK 12-inch single
A1. "Damn I Wish I Was Your Lover" (long version) – 5:22
B1. "Listen" – 3:31
B2. "Don't Stop Swaying" – 5:32

 European maxi-CD single
 "Damn I Wish I Was Your Lover" (radio edit) – 4:08
 "Don't Stop Swaying" – 5:32
 "Listen" – 3:32

Personnel
 Mixed by David Leonard and Steve Churchyard
 Produced by Ralph Schuckett and Rick Chertoff

Charts and certifications

Weekly charts

Year-end charts

Certifications

Cover versions
 Black Kids covered it on their "I'm Not Gonna Teach Your Boyfriend How to Dance with You" single.
 Elephant Micah covered it on their 2004 Home of Astronauts EP.
 Matt Palmer covered is on his 2010 album Let Go.
 Spin Aqua covered it as a B-side on their "Mermaid" single.
 Former Pussycat Doll J Sutta covered it on her first album Feline Resurrection.
 Halestorm covered it on their Reanimate 3.0 EP, released in 2017.

References

External links
 Clips from The Cream Will Rise, including a clip describing Hawkins' feelings about the banned "Damn" video
 YouTube – Original video

1990s ballads
1992 debut singles
1992 songs
Black-and-white music videos
Columbia Records singles
Lesbian-related songs
Pop ballads
Rock ballads
LGBT-related songs
Song recordings produced by Rick Chertoff
Songs written by Sophie B. Hawkins
Sophie B. Hawkins songs